Teo Mikelić (born 22 August 1992) is a Croatian professional kickboxer, who formerly competed in World version W5, Glory and FFC promotion. From July to October 2017, he was ranked #8 lightweight world kickboxer by Liverkick.com.

Kickboxing career

FFC
Mikelić made his professional debut against Rene Pavić at Opatija Fight Night 3 on February 20, 2011. He won the fight by a first-round knockout. Mikelić next faced his first foreign opponent, Mamadou Sly, at Mega Fight on July 21, 2012. He won the fight by unanimous decision.

After amassing a 3–0 record, Mikelić signed with Final Fight Championship. Mikelić made his promotional debut against the future FFC Lightweight champion Samo Petje at FFC06: Jurković vs. Poturak on June 14, 2013. He won the fight by unanimous decision. Mikelić faced Slobodan Kajmakoski at FFC10: Rodriguez vs. Batzelas on December 13, 2013, in his second appearance with the promotion. He once again won the fight by unanimous decision.

FFC & Glory
Mikelić made his Glory debut against Murthel Groenhart at Glory 14: Zagreb on March 8, 2014. He lost the fight by a first-round technical knockout, as the fight was stopped at the end of the round on the advice of the ringside physician, due to a cut Mikelić suffered during the bout.

After suffering the first loss of his professional career, Mikelić was booked to face Mirko Vorkapić at FFC12: Fabjan vs. Daley	on April 25, 2014. He won the fight by a first-round technical knockout. Mikelić then took part in the 2014 Qabala Fight Series lightweight tournament, held during the organization's inaugural event on June 29, 2014. Although he was able to overcome Tadas Jonkus by unanimous decision in the quarterfinals of the one-day tournament, he would in turn lose a unanimous decision to Juri Kehl in the semifinals, after an extra fourth round was contested.

Mikelić faced Samo Petje for the vacant FFC lightweight championship at FFC14: Petje vs. Mikelić on October 3, 2014. He lost the fight by a first-round knockout, as Petje floored him with a head kick. 

Mikelić snapped the first losing skid of his career with an extra round majority decision over Fabio Di Marco at FFC18: Ljubljana on April 17, 2015. Mikelić extended his winning streak to two straight fights at TTS Open Fight on June 20, 2015, as he knocked Antun Viličić out with a head kick in the second round.

Mikelić faced Tigran Movsisyan at FFC 19 - Linz on September 18, 2015. He was stopped with a flurry of punches at the 2:40 minute mark of the third round, after being knocked down with a left hook earlier in the round. Mikelić made his second and final Glory appearance against Anatoly Moiseev at Glory 25: Milan on November 6, 2015. He lost the fight by unanimous decision.

European circuit
Mikelić faced Vasile Lazăr for the vacant Kombat League European Lightweight (-70 kg) Championship at Trieste Boxing Day 4 on May 21, 2016. He captured the title by a third-round technical knockout. Mikelić next faced Ramazan Razakov in the first round of the 2017 Tatneft Cup selection tournament, held on March 22, 2017. He lost the fight by unanimous decision.

Mikelić faced Nikola Cimeša at W5 Undefeated 40 on April 8, 2017. He won the fight by unanimous decision. Mikelić took part in the 2017 The King Of Martial Arts lightweight (-70 kg) muay thai tournament, held on May 20, 2017 and contested in MMA gloves. He was able to beat Igor Kozak by decision in the semifinals, but lost a unanimous decision to Klayton Henriquez in the finals, after he was knocked down with a right hook.

Mikelić faced Damiano Ardigo at the October 14, 2017, Petrosyanmania event. Ardigo stepped in as a short notice replacement for Mustapha Haida, who was forced to withdraw with an injury. Mikelić needed just 57 seconds to stop his opponent with a head kick. Mikelić faced Thomas Leitner at FFC30: Linz on October 21, 2017. He won the fight by unanimous decision. Mikelić was then booked to face Marco Ronchetti at Iron Fighter on November 17, 2017. He won the fight by unanimous decision. It was the first time that he had won three consecutive fights since 2013.

Mikelić faced Sayfullah Hambahadov in the semifinals of the one-day CFL lightweight (-70 kg) tournament at CFL 2 on April 12, 2018. He lost the fight by unanimous decision. Mikelić faced Chris McMillan at FFC 33 on November 3, 2018. Although he was able to break McMillan's arm, he nonetheless lost the fight by split decision. Despite having suffered three straight losses, Mikelić was booked to challenge Čedo Pantić for the Megdan lightweight (-70 kg) championship at Megdan 4 on March 16, 2019. He lost the fight by unanimous decision.

Mikelić faced Raffaele Minichino at Gladijator Fight Night 4 on February 22, 2020. He won the fight by a first-round head kick knockout. Mikelić next faced Aurimas Krukauskas at KOK 96 Mega Battle on November 20, 2021. He won the fight by a second-round technical knockout.

Mikelić faced Mindaugas Narauskas in the quarterfinals of the King of Kings -73 kg tournament, held at KOK Mega Series 2022 on March 19, 2022. He lost the fight by a first-round knockout. Mikelić was booked to face Jasmin Ramić at King of Arena on June 11, 2022. He won the fight by a first-round technical knockout. Mikelić faced Leo Brichta at Noc Bojovníků Dobříš 5 on September 22, 2022. He lost the fight by unanimous decision. Mikelić rebounded from this loss with a third-round knockout of Jakub Kadas at RFA 6 on November 12, 2022.

Mikelić faced Pirun Wangpol-Komphikart at Blade Fights on February 4, 2023. He lost the fight by a first-round technical knockout.

Championships and accomplishments

Amateur
World Association of Kickboxing Organizations
2012 WAKO European Championship 3rd Place, Full-Contact (-75 kg)
Croatian Kickboxing Championship
2013 Croatian Kickboxing Championship Runner-up, Full-Contact (-75 kg)
2014 Croatian Kickboxing Championship Winner, K-1 (-75 kg)

Professional
Kombat League
Kombat League European Lightweight Champion -70 kg

Kickboxing record

|- |-  bgcolor="#FFBBBB"
| 2023-02-04 || Loss ||align=left| Pirun Wangpol-Komphikart || Blade Fights || Kaunas, Lithuania || TKO (Punches) || 1 || 
|- 
|- |-  bgcolor="#CCFFCC"
| 2022-11-12 || Win ||align=left| Jakub Kadáš || RFA 6 || Prievidza, Slovakia || KO (Head kick) || 3 || 0:16
|- 
|- |-  bgcolor="#FFBBBB"
| 2022-09-24 || Loss ||align=left| Leo Brichta || Noc Bojovníků Dobříš 5 || Dobříš, Czech Republic || Decision (Unanimous) || 3 || 3:00 
|- 
|- |-  bgcolor="#CCFFCC"
| 2022-06-11 || Win ||align=left| Jasmin Ramić || King of Arena|| Pula, Croatia || TKO (Leg injury) || 1 || 1:11
|- 
|- |-  bgcolor="#FFBBBB"
| 2022-04-15 || Loss ||align=left| Ott Remmer || The League III || Tallinn, Estonia || Decision (Unanimous) || 3 || 3:00 
|- 
|- |-  bgcolor="#FFBBBB"
| 2022-03-19 || Loss ||align=left| Mindaugas Narauskas || KOK Mega Series 2022 || Vilnius, Lithuania || KO || 1 ||  
|- 
|- |-  bgcolor="#CCFFCC"
| 2022-02-26 || Win ||align=left| Hubert Dylewski || KOK 98 World Series in Riga || Riga, Latvia || Decision (Unanimous) || 3 ||  3:00
|- 
|- |-  bgcolor="#CCFFCC"
| 2021-12-20 || Win ||align=left| Viachest Andreiev || FFC 5 || Alanya, Turkey || Decision (Unanimous) || 3 || 3:00
|- 
|- |-  bgcolor="#CCFFCC"
| 2021-11-20 || Win ||align=left| Aurimas Krukauskas || KOK 96 Mega Battle|| Vilnius, Lithuania || KO (Cut from Knee) || 2 ||  
|- 
|- |-  bgcolor="#CCFFCC"
| 2021-02-28 || Win ||align=left| Andreas Čehovski || UNDC Last Man Standing || Brno, Czech Republic || Decision (Unanimous) || 3 ||  3:00
|- 
|-  bgcolor="#CCFFCC"
| 2020-02-22 || Win ||align=left| Raffaele Minichino || Gladijator Fight Night 4|| Pula, Croatia || KO (High Kick) || 1 ||  |
|- 
|-  bgcolor="#FFBBBB"
| 2019-03-16 ||  Loss  ||align=left| Čedo Pantić || Megdan 4 || Novi Sad, Serbia || Decision (Unanimous)  || 3 || 3:00 
|-
! style=background:white colspan=9 |
|-
|-  bgcolor="#FFBBBB"
| 2018-11-03 ||  Loss  ||align=left| Chris McMillan || FFC 33 || Las Vegas, Nevada, USA || Decision (Split)  || 3 || 3:00 
|-
|-  bgcolor="#FFBBBB"
| 2018-04-12 ||  Loss  ||align=left| Khambakhadov Saifullah || CFL 2, Semi FInals || Belgrade, Serbia || Decision (Unanimous)  || 3 || 3:00 
|-
|-  bgcolor="#CCFFCC"
| 2017-11-17 || Win ||align=left| Marco Ronchetti || Iron Fighter || Pordenone, Italia || Decision (Unanimous) || 5 || 3:00 
|-
|-  bgcolor="#CCFFCC"
| 2017-10-21 ||  Win  ||align=left| Thomas Leitner || FFC30: Linz || Linz, Austria || Decision (Unanimous)  || 3 || 3:00 
|-
|-  bgcolor="#CCFFCC"
| 2017-10-14 ||  Win  ||align=left| Damiano Ardigo || Petrosyanmania || Monza, Italy || KO (Head kick) || 1 || 0:57 
|-
|-  bgcolor="#FFBBBB"
| 2017-05-20 ||  Loss  ||align=left| Klayton Henriquez || The King Of Martial Arts, Semi Finals || Trieste, Italy || Decision (Unanimous)  || 3 || 3:00 
|-
|-  bgcolor="#CCFFCC"
| 2017-05-20 ||  Win  ||align=left| Igor Kozak || The King Of Martial Arts, Quarter Finals || Trieste, Italy || Decision  || 3 || 3:00 
|-
|-  bgcolor="#CCFFCC"
| 2017-04-08 ||  Win  ||align=left| Nikola Cimeša || W5 Undefeated 40 || Dubrovnik, Croatia || Decision (Unanimous) || 3 || 3:00 
|-
|-  bgcolor="#FFBBBB"
| 2017-03-22 ||  Loss  ||align=left| Ramazan Razakov || Tatneft Cup 2017 - 1st selection 1/8 final || Kazan, Russia || Decision (Unanimous) || 3 || 3:00 
|-
|-  bgcolor="#CCFFCC"
| 2016-05-21 || Win ||align=left| Vasile Lazăr || Trieste Boxing Day 4 || Trieste, Italy || KO (Left uppercut) || 3 || 2:27 
|-
! style=background:white colspan=9 |
|-
|-  bgcolor="#FFBBBB"
| 2015-11-06 ||  Loss  ||align=left| Anatoly Moiseev || Glory 25: Milan|| Monza, Italy || Decision (Unanimous) || 3 || 3:00 
|-
|-  bgcolor= "#FFBBBB"
| 2015-09-18 || Loss||align=left| Tigran Movsisyan  || FFC 19 - Linz || Linz, Austria || TKO (Punches) || 3 || 2:40 
|-
|-  bgcolor="CCFFCC"
| 2015-06-20 || Win ||align=left| Antun Viličić || TTS Open Fight || Varaždin, Croatia || KO (High kick) || 2 ||  
|-
|-  bgcolor="CCFFCC"
| 2015-04-17 || Win ||align=left| Fabio Di Marco || FFC18: Ljubljana || Ljubljana, Slovenia || Ext. R. Decision (Majority) || 4 || 3:00 
|-
|-  bgcolor="#FFBBBB"
| 2014-10-03 || Loss ||align=left| Samo Petje || FFC14: Petje vs. Mikelić || Ljubljana, Slovenia || KO (Right high kick) || 1 || 1:05 
|-
! style=background:white colspan=9 |
|-
|-  bgcolor="#FFBBBB"
| 2014-06-29 || Loss ||align=left| Juri Kehl || Qabala Fight Series #1, Semi Finals || Qabala, Azerbaijan || Ext. R. Decision (Unanimous) || 3 || 3:00 
|-
|-  bgcolor="CCFFCC"
| 2014-06-29 || Win ||align=left| Tadas Jonkus || Qabala Fight Series #1, Quarter Finals || Qabala, Azerbaijan || Decision (Unanimous) || 3 || 3:00 
|-
|-  bgcolor="CCFFCC"
| 2014-04-25 || Win ||align=left| Mirko Vorkapić ||  FFC12: Fabjan vs. Daley  || Ljubljana, Slovenia || TKO (Cut) || 1 || 1:23 
|-
|-  bgcolor="#FFBBBB"
| 2014-03-08 || Win ||align=left| Murthel Groenhart || Glory 14: Zagreb || Zagreb, Croatia || TKO (Cut) || 1 || 3:00 
|-
|-  bgcolor="CCFFCC"
| 2013-12-13 || Win ||align=left| Slobodan Kajmakoski || FFC10: Rodriguez vs. Batzelas || Skopje, Macedonia || Decision (Unanimous) || 3 || 3:00 
|-
|-  bgcolor="CCFFCC"
| 2013-06-14 || Win ||align=left| Samo Petje || FFC06: Jurković vs. Poturak || Poreč, Croatia || Decision (Unanimous) || 3 || 2:00 
|-
|-  bgcolor="#CCFFCC"
| 2012-07-21 || Win ||align=left| Mamadou Sly || Mega Fight  || Umag, Croatia || Decision (Unanimous) || 3 || 2:00 
|-
|-  bgcolor="CCFFCC"
| 2011-02-20 || Win ||align=left| Rene Pavić || Opatija Fight Night 3 || Opatija, Croatia ||  KO (Kick) || 1 || 
|-
|-

|-  bgcolor="#CCFFCC"
| 2014-04-12 || Win ||align=left| Manuel Smoljan || Croatian Kickboxing Championship, K-1 Final -75 kg || Poreč, Croatia || Decision (Split) || 3 || 2:00
|-
! style=background:white colspan=9 |
|-
|-  bgcolor="#CCFFCC"
| 2014-04-12 || Win ||align=left| Luka Habek || Croatian Kickboxing Championship, K-1 Semi Finals -75 kg || Poreč, Croatia || Decision (Unanimous) || 3 || 2:00
|-
|-  bgcolor="#CCFFCC"
| 2014-04-12 || Win ||align=left| Marko Gelo || Croatian Kickboxing Championship, K-1 Quarter Finals -75 kg || Poreč, Croatia || Decision (Unanimous) || 3 || 2:00
|-
|-  bgcolor="#FFBBBB"
| 2013-03-23 || Loss ||align=left| Manuel Smoljan || Croatian Kickboxing Championship, Full-Cotact Final -75 kg || Split, Croatia || Decision (Unanimous) || 3 || 2:00
|-
! style=background:white colspan=9 |
|-
|-  bgcolor="#CCFFCC"
| 2013-03-23 || Win ||align=left| Dario Gvozdanović || Croatian Kickboxing Championship, Full-Cotact Final -75 kg || Split, Croatia || Decision (Split) || 3 || 2:00
|-
|-  bgcolor="#FFBBBB"
| 2012-11 || Loss ||align=left| Andreas Lødrup || W.A.K.O European Championships 2012, Full-Contact Semi Finals -75 kg || Bucharest, Romania ||Decision (Unanimous) || 3 || 2:00
|-
! style=background:white colspan=9 |
|-
|-  bgcolor="#CCFFCC"
| 2012-11-29 || Win ||align=left| Laszlo Szabo || W.A.K.O European Championships 2012, Full-Contact Quarter Finals -75 kg || Bucharest, Romania || Decision (Unanimous) || 3 || 2:00
|-
|-  bgcolor="#CCFFCC"
| 2012-11-27 || Win ||align=left| Ionel Alexandru || W.A.K.O European Championships 2012, Full-Contact Second Round -75 kg || Bucharest, Romania ||  ||  || 
|-
|-  bgcolor="#CCFFCC"
| 2012-11-27 || Win ||align=left| Antonios Gavalas || W.A.K.O European Championships 2012, Full-Contact First Round -75 kg || Bucharest, Romania || Decision (Unanimous) || 3 || 2:00
|-
|-  bgcolor="#FFBBBB"
| 2010-09 || Loss ||align=left| Vladimir Shiryaev || W.A.K.O Junior European Championships 2010, Low-Kick Quarter Finals -75 kg || Belgrade, Serbia ||  ||  || 
|-
|-  bgcolor="#CCFFCC"
| 2010-09 || Win ||align=left| Dimitar Gjorgjiev || W.A.K.O Junior European Championships 2010, Low-Kick First Round -75 kg || Belgrade, Serbia ||  ||  || 
|-
|-
| colspan=9 | Legend:

See also
List of WAKO Amateur World Championships
List of WAKO Amateur European Championships
List of male kickboxers

References

External links
Profile at Glory World Series

Living people
1992 births
Croatian male kickboxers
Croatian Muay Thai practitioners
Lightweight kickboxers
People from Pula
Glory kickboxers